Russell Claydon (born 19 November 1965) is an English professional golfer.

Claydon was born in Cambridge, England. He won the English Amateur in 1988 and turned professional in 1989. He played on the European Tour from 1989 to 2004. He was in the top one hundred on the Order of Merit every year from 1990 to 1999, with a best placing of twentieth in 1997. He had six second place tournament finishes on the tour before picking up his first and only win at the 1998 BMW International Open.

Claydon struggled for form in the new Millennium and by 2005 he was playing few tournaments. However, he remained involved with the European Tour as a member of its board of directors. He was also a member of England's three man team in the 1997 Alfred Dunhill Cup.

Amateur wins
1988 English Amateur, Berkshire Trophy, Lagonda Trophy
1989 St Andrews Links Trophy, Lake Macquarie Amateur

Professional wins (2)

European Tour wins (1)

European Tour playoff record (0–1)

PGA EuroPro Tour wins (1)

Results in major championships

Note: Claydon only played in The Open Championship.

LA = Low amateur
CUT = missed the half-way cut
"T" = tied

Team appearances
Amateur
Walker Cup (representing Great Britain & Ireland): 1989 (winners)
European Amateur Team Championship (representing England): 1989

Professional
Dunhill Cup (representing England): 1997

References

External links

English male golfers
European Tour golfers
Sportspeople from Cambridge
People from Fulbourn
1965 births
Living people